Harrisburg Intermodal Yard is a large rail yard located in Harrisburg, Pennsylvania. The yard used to be operated by Conrail, and since 1999, has been operated by the Norfolk Southern Railway. The Harrisburg Yard, the Enola Yard and the Rutherford Yard are the three major rail facilities located in the Harrisburg area.

See also
 Buffalo Line
 Harrisburg Line

References

External links
 Norfolk Southern Railway facilities

Conrail
Norfolk Southern Railway
Rail yards in Pennsylvania
Transportation buildings and structures in Dauphin County, Pennsylvania